Pfann may refer to one of the following individuals:
Bill Pfann (1863–1904), American professional baseball player
George Pfann (1902–1996), American football player and coach
Hans Pfann (1920–2021), German Olympic gymnast
William Gardner Pfann (1917–1982), American inventor and materials scientist